Gimayev is a Tatar masculine surname, its feminine counterpart is Gimayeva. Notable people with the surname include:

Sergei Gimayev (disambiguation), multiple people
Irek Gimayev (born 1957), Soviet ice hockey player

Tatar-language surnames